Andreas Campollo Esswein (born 26 January 1997) is a professional footballer who plays for Malaysia Super League club Kelantan.

Career
Born in Bruchsal, Germany to a Filipino mother and a German father", Esswein left the SV Waldhof Mannheim youth team, who competed in the U19 Bundesliga in 2015 for Spöck in the sixth division after a transfer to another U19 Bundesliga team never materialized.

After playing for Spöck, which he saw as a short-term way to play regularly, Esswein signed for Global F.C. in the Philippines through fellow Filipino-German player Stephan Schröck.

In 2017, Esswein played for Davao Aguilas F.C. in the professional Philippines Football League, where he made only eleven league appearances due to dengue fever and scored zero goals.
After signing for Davao Aguilas F.C. he got a Call-up for the Philippine U23 Nationalteam for an international friendly match against Bahrain in Manama where he made his debut on international level.

Around December 2017 Esswein received an offer from Thailand to play in their Thai League but due to failed terms and negotiations of the contract during the transfer window Esswein ended up being free agent.

SV Waldhof Mannheim
After his stint at FC Astoria Walldorf, Esswein transferred to SV Waldhof Mannheim in 2014.

Joining SV Waldhof Mannheim gave him the opportunity to compete in the U19 Bundesliga which is the highest possible level in youth football.

Global
in 2016 Global F.C. announced the signing of Andreas Esswein.

After winning the UFL League and Cup, Esswein also made his appearance in the Singapore Cup at the Jalan Besar Stadium in Singapore against Cambodian side Nagaworld FC.
During the season 2016/2017 Global F.C. became financially unstable which made Esswein decide to transfer to Davao Aguilas F.C.

Davao Aguilas
In March 2017 Esswein and Davao Aguilas F.C. announced the mutual agreement of the player and the club.
Esswein was the first ever foreign born Filipino that signed for the club.
After their training camp in Malaysia where they competed against Malaysian Super League Teams and their training camp in Singapore Esswein got infected by the dengue fever and had to miss out a couple of PFL League Games.

Return to Global
Return to Global F.C. in January 2020.
Esswein and the club announced the succeeded signing in the year of 2020, but the COVID-19 pandemic put the Philippines Football League on hold and the management of Global F.C. failed to pay its wages to its staff and players which led to a FIFA ban which again made Esswein a free agent player.

United City
On March 12 United City Football Club officially announced the signing of Andreas Esswein. Esswein will compete in the Philippines Football League once again and also in the AFC Champions League.

Early life
Esswein was born on 26 January 1997 in Bruchsal, Germany to a German father and a Filipino mother. His mother is from Daet, Camarines Norte.
Esswein also has an older brother Kevin Esswein who is eligible to play for the Philippine Nationalteam.
Kevin Esswein played for Karlsruher SC and later TSG 1899 Hoffenheim.
Another Filipino-German relative of him, Cameron Royo which is his cousin, was signed by 2.Bundesliga club SV Darmstadt 98.

Honours
SV Waldhof Mannheim
 U19 Bundesliga: 2014–15

Global
 Groupe Stage for AFC Cup 2017
 Qualified for AFC Champions League play-offs
 United Football League Cup winner: 2016

References

1997 births
Living people
People from Bruchsal
Sportspeople from Karlsruhe (region)
Footballers from Baden-Württemberg
Citizens of the Philippines through descent
Filipino footballers
German footballers
German sportspeople of Filipino descent
Filipino people of German descent
Association football midfielders
SV Waldhof Mannheim players
Global Makati F.C. players
Davao Aguilas F.C. players
Ceres–Negros F.C. players
Philippines Football League players
Andreas Esswein
Andreas Esswein